Tim Seibles (born 1955) is an American poet, professor and the former Poet Laureate of Virginia. He is the author of five collections of poetry, most recently, Fast Animal (Etruscan Press, 2012). His honors include an Open Voice Award and fellowships from the National Endowment for the Arts and the Provincetown Fine Arts Work Center. In 2012 he was nominated for a National Book Award, for Fast Animal.

Work
His poems have been published in literary journals and magazines including Callaloo, The Kenyon Review, Indiana Review, Ploughshares, Electronic Poetry Review, Rattle, and in anthologies including Verse & Universe: Poems About Science and Mathematics (Milkweed Editions, 1998) and New American Poets in the 90’s (David R. Godine, 1991).

Seibles was a professor of English at Old Dominion University in Norfolk, Virginia.

Life
Seibles was born in Philadelphia, Pennsylvania and earned his B.A. from Southern Methodist University in 1977. He remained in Dallas after graduating and taught high school English for ten years. He received his M.F.A. from Vermont College of Fine Arts in 1990. He is a professor of English and creative writing at Old Dominion University, as well as teaching in the Stonecoast MFA Program in Creative Writing and teaching workshops for Cave Canem Foundation. 
He has a son, Cade Seibles. He lives in Norfolk, Virginia.

Published works
Full-length poetry collections
One Turn Around the Sun(Etruscan Press, 2017)  
 Fast Animal (Etruscan Press, 2012) 
 Buffalo Head Solos (Cleveland State University Poetry Center, 2004) 
 Hammerlock (Cleveland State University Poetry Center, 1999) 
 Hurdy-Gurdy (Cleveland State University Poetry Center, 1992) 
 Body Moves (Corona Press, 1988); Carnegie Mellon University Press, 2012, 

Chapbooks
 Ten Miles an Hour, Mille Grazie Press, 1998, 
 Kerosene (Ampersand Press, 1995) 

In Anthology
 Ghost Fishing: An Eco-Justice Poetry Anthology (University of Georgia Press, 2018) 
 Seeds of Fire: Contemporary Poetry from the Other U. S. A. (Smokestack Books, 2008)

References

External links

 Poet Profile: Ploughshares > Authors & Articles > Spring 1995 > Tim Seibles, Contributor Spotlight by Don Lee
 Interview: Poem of the Week > An Interview with Tim Seibles > by Andrew McFadyen-Ketchum
 Review: Bookslut February 2005 > Review by Joey Rubin of Buffalo Head Solos by Tim Seibles
 Audio: NPR > June 12, 2009 > 2003 Sunken Garden Poetry Festival > Tim Seibles Reads Fearless
 Author Page: CSU Poetry Center > Tim Seibles > Buffalo Head Solos
 Tim Seibles' Faculty Page at Old Dominion University
 Tim Seibles - Facebook Author's page

American male poets
African-American poets
Living people
Poets from Virginia
Poets from Pennsylvania
Southern Methodist University alumni
Vermont College of Fine Arts alumni
National Endowment for the Arts Fellows
1955 births
Old Dominion University faculty
Writers from Norfolk, Virginia
20th-century American poets
21st-century American poets
PEN Oakland/Josephine Miles Literary Award winners
20th-century American male writers
21st-century American male writers
20th-century African-American writers
21st-century African-American writers
African-American male writers